The Union of Free Democrats (Sajuz na svobodnite demokrati) is a conservative political party in Bulgaria, led by Stefan Sofiyanski. It contested the 2001 elections as part of the United Democratic Forces electoral alliance, which picked up 51 of 240 seats. It joined the Bulgarian People's Union, that at the 2005 Bulgarian parliamentary election won 5.7% of the popular vote and 13 out of 240 seats.

References

External links
Official web site

Conservative parties in Bulgaria